Ray Ofisa Treviranus (born 22 March 1980), commonly known as Ray Ofisa, is a Samoan former professional rugby union player. He primarily played as a flanker Ofisa spent most of his professional career with Irish provincial side Connacht, earning over 100 caps for the team after joining from North Otago in the 2006–07 season. Ofisa also represented  internationally, making one appearance for the national side against  in 2011.

Ofisa's younger brothers Ofisa Treviranus and Alapati Leiua are also rugby players, with both having played for Samoa. Ofisa Treviranus played alongside his brother at Connacht for a year in the 2007–08 season.

References

1980 births
Living people
Connacht Rugby players
Samoan expatriate rugby union players
Samoa international rugby union players
Samoan rugby union players
Rugby union flankers